Ooonga may refer to:

 Oonga (film), an Indian film
 Oonga, Estonia, a village
 Motu Oonga, an island in Kiribati

See also 
 Ounga (disambiguation)